The 2022–23 season is Dundee United's 114th season. It is their third season back in the Scottish Premiership, having been promoted from the Scottish Championship at the end of the 2019–20 season. The club will also participate in the League Cup and Scottish Cup.

Season summary
Dundee United finished the previous season in fourth place which allowed them to enter the third qualifying round of the Europa Conference League. United began the season under the management of Jack Ross who was appointed on a two-year deal following the departure of Tam Courts. Ross was sacked on 30 August after just seven matches, which culminated in his side's 9–0 loss to Celtic.

Competitions

Results and fixtures

Pre-season and friendlies

Scottish Premiership

Scottish League Cup

Scottish Cup

UEFA Europa Conference League

Third qualifying round

Player statistics

Appearances and goals

|-
|colspan="5"|Players who left the club during the 2022–23 season
|-

|}

Team statistics

League table

Transfers

Players in

Players out

Loans in

Loans out

References

Dundee United F.C. seasons
Dundee United
2022–23 UEFA Europa Conference League participants seasons